Musabeyli is a settlement in Kilis Province, Turkey.

Musabeyli may also refer to:

Musabeyli, Edirne
Musabeyli, Agsu, Azerbaijan
Musabəyli, Fizuli, Azerbaijan